Beech Hill is a mountain located in the Catskill Mountains of New York east-southeast of Downsville. Middle Mountain is located west of Beech Hill.

References

Mountains of Delaware County, New York
Mountains of New York (state)